Lucianna Krecarová (born 4 January 1965), known by the stage name Anna K, is a Czech award-winning singer. She was named female singer of the year at the 1999 and 2006 Anděl Awards. Anna K was diagnosed with breast cancer in 2009. She took part in the 2016 series of the Czech television programme StarDance, dancing with Marek Hrstka.

Discography

Studio albums
1993: Já nezapomínám
1995: Amulet
1999: Nebe
2001: Stačí, když se díváš...
2002: Musím tě svést
2004: Noc na zemi – limitovaná edice
2005: Noc na zemi
2006: Večernice
2007: Best of 93–07
2011: Relativní čas

Awards and nominations

References

External links

1965 births
Living people
People from Vrchlabí
20th-century Czech women singers
Czech pop singers
21st-century Czech women singers